Meteor was a German survey vessel, noted for her survey work in the Atlantic Ocean between 1925 and 1927. Handed over to the Soviet Union following World War II, the ship was renamed Ekvator. Her ultimate fate is not known.

Design and construction 

Her keel was laid at the Kaiserliche Werft at Danzig in February 1914 and Meteor was launched in January 1915. Originally intended to become a gunboat for the Imperial German Navy's colonial service she was not finished during the First World War due to limited need for lightly armed vessels.

After the war the uncompleted hull was tugged to Wilhelmshaven for outfitting work at the Reichsmarinewerft. She was outfitted as a survey vessel and early sonar equipment was fitted. The ship had a steel hull with two propellers each driven by a triple-expansion steam engine. Additionally she had a brigantine rig to boost range.

Career
Meteor was commissioned as a military ship with the Reichsmarine but spent most of her life in a scientific role.

Scientific work 

Meteor entered service in November 1924 and made her maiden survey expedition between 20 January and 17 February 1925 with the main purpose to check the equipment. On 16 April 1925 Meteor started the German Atlantic expedition, also known as German Meteor expedition, and did not return to Germany until 2 June 1927. This bank was named "Meteor Bank".

Between 1929 and 1935 Meteor made several journeys to Iceland and Greenland, where she performed survey work as well as fishery protection duties.

A North Atlantic Expedition was performed in 1937/38 in order to take cross sections of the North Atlantic that complemented the earlier survey work done in the South Atlantic. In order to distinguish it from the smaller bank found in the South Atlantic, this bank was named "Great Meteor Bank" and is today known as Great Meteor Seamount.

Second World War 
With the outbreak of the Second World War the ship was removed from service on 8 September 1939. Reactivated in 1940 Meteor was used as a tender in the Baltic Sea as well along the Norwegian Coast. With the end of the war, the ship was laid off in Kiel.

Soviet service 
In November 1945 the ship was handed over to the Soviet Union, but briefly returned into German service for a few months in 1946 to perform survey work under Soviet supervision. Eventually she became the Soviet survey vessel Ekvator. Her final fate is unclear, she was either scrapped in 1968 or survived some more years as a barracks ship.

Heritage 
Two German research vessels were named after the Meteor:
 ; sold to New Zealand in 1986 and renamed Rapuhia; scrapped 1993
 ; in service

See also 
 German Meteor expedition 1925-27
 Meteor Deep, deepest spot of the South Sandwich Trench (8,428 m)
 Great Meteor Seamount

References

Sources

Research vessels of Germany
Ships built in Danzig
Ships built in Wilhelmshaven
Auxiliary ships of the Reichsmarine
Auxiliary ships of the Kriegsmarine
Research vessels of the Soviet Union
1915 ships